Bocardo SA v Star Energy UK Onshore Ltd [2010] UKSC 35 is a UK enterprise law case, concerning oil and gas.

Facts
Bocardo claimed Star Energy (now owned by IGas Energy) committed trespass, and that a licence under the Petroleum (Production) Act 1934 was no defence. Star Energy had a licence to search for, bore and get petroleum under the Petroleum (Production) Act 1934 section 2 at Palmers Wood Oil Field, at Godstone in Surrey. It got the licence in 1999, though it was originally issued by the Secretary of State for Energy in 1980 to Conoco. Star Energy had never sought Bocardo's permission.

Judgment

High Court
Peter Smith J held that Bocardo's title extended to the substrata beneath the land's surface, and though the pipelines cause not damage, nor affected enjoyment, there was a trespass. Under the Mines (Working Facilities and Support) Act 1966 s 8(2) compensation would be based on ‘what would be fair and reasonable between a willing grantor and a willing grantee’. He awarded £621,180, calculated at 9% of the value of the oil extracted between July 2000 and December 2007, and continuing damages for trespass based on the same.

Court of Appeal
The Court of Appeal reduced compensation to £1,000, on the basis that the trespass was actionable but technical.

Supreme Court
The Supreme Court held by a majority of three to two that the Court of Appeal had been correct. Bocardo did own the ground, and was entitled to claim for trespass by the wells. Star Energy had no defence in trespass under PPA 1934 s 10(3) (re-enacted in PA 1998 s 9(2). It was irrelevant if a landowner did not make use of the ground. But, for assessing damages, the right measure was the amount of compensation payable under the  Mines (Working Facilities and Support) Act 1966. This operated to prevent the powerful bargaining position of a landowner to control access to a potentially valuable oilfield.

Lord Hope, giving the first and dissenting judgment, said a landowner did own the ground beneath, including minerals, unless there was a conveyance or statute, as in Mitchell [1914] 1 Ch 438. There had to be a logical limit, where pressure and temperature to the Earth's core made ownership so absurd as to be not worth arguing about, but the wells were not that deep.

Lord Walker agreed on the trespass issue, but said the Court of Appeal was right on damages.

Lord Brown said the right compensation was small. In his view by the PPA 1934, giving the Crown exclusive rights:

Lord Collins agreed with Lord Hope on the principles and Lord Brown on quantum.

Lord Clarke dissented.

See also

United Kingdom enterprise law

Notes

References

United Kingdom enterprise case law